This is a list of Antarctic women. It includes explorers, researchers, educators, administrators and adventurers. They are arranged by the country of their latest citizenship rather than by country of birth.

Argentina
Viviana Alder (born 1957), marine microbiologist
Irene Bernasconi (1896–1989), echinoderm specialist, member of the first team of Argentine scientists to work on Antarctica in 1968
Patricia Ortúzar (graduated 2001), geographer, writer
Carmen Pujals (1916–2003), botanist, member of the first team of Argentine scientists to work on Antarctica in 1968
Irene Schloss (PhD 1997), plankton biologist

Australia
Nerilie Abram (born 1977), climate change environmentalist
Leanne Armand (born 1968), marine scientist, diatom ecologist
Dana Bergstrom (born 1962), ecologist, biosecurity specialist, writer
Hope Black (born 1919), marine biologist, educator, early sub-Antarctic researcher
Elizabeth Chipman (born 1934), writer, one of the first Australian women to set foot on the Antarctic mainland in 1975
Louise Crossley (1942–2015), South-African born environmentalist, station leader
Amanda Davies, geographer
Gwen Fenton (PhD 1985), biologist, first woman to be chief scientist of the Australian Antarctic Division
Samantha Hall (born 1982), environmental researcher
Catherine King (graduated 1992), environmentalist specializing in ecotoxicology research
Delphine Lannuzel (graduated 2001), Belgian-born biogeochemist, educator
Nel Law (1914–1990), artist, writer, first Australian woman to set foot in Antarctica in 1961
Diana Patterson (born early 1950s), first woman to head an Australian Antarctic station
Sally Poncet (born 1954), biologist, ornithologist, explorer
Anya Marie Reading (PhD 1997), seismology and computational methods
Patricia Margaret Selkirk (born 1942), plant biologist, ecologist
Justine Shaw (graduated 1996), ecologist, conservation scientist
Jan Strugnell (born 1976), evolutionary molecular biologist
Elizabeth Truswell (born 1941), palynologist, visual artist
Miriam-Rose Ungunmerr-Baumann (born 1950), one of the first two indigenous Australians to visit Antarctica 
Barbara Wienecke (PhD 1993), Namibian-born seabird ecologist
Nerida Wilson (graduated 1998), invertebrate marine biologist

Belgium
Annick Wilmotte (graduated 1982), microbiologist

Brazil
Edith Fanta (1943–2008), biologist, Antarctic fish researcher
Vivian Pellizari (graduated 1992), microbiologist

Brunei
Dk Najibah Era Al-Sufri (born 1983), first Bruneian to reach the South Pole

Bulgaria
Roumiana Metcheva (born 1950), ecotoxicologist

Canada
Josée Auclair (born 1962), polar explorer, first Canadian woman to have headed expeditions to the North and South Poles
Kathleen Conlan (born 1950), marine biologist, explorer
Jennie Darlington (1919–2009), explorer, one of the first women to overwinter in Antarctica in 1947–48

Chile
Veronica Vallejos (born late 1960s), marine biologist, conservationist
Angélica Casanova-Katny (born late 1960s), plant ecophysiologist, global change studies

China
Yan Liu (graduated 2003), iceberg calving specialist, environmentalist
Lijie Wei (born 1974), paleontologist, stratigraphist

Czech Republic
Linda Nedbalova (born 1976), biologist, writer

Denmark
Dorthe Dahl-Jensen (born 1958), geophysicist, ice and climate researcher
Caroline Mikkelsen (1906 - late 1990s), explorer, first woman to set foot on Antarctica or an Antarctic island in 1935

France
Laurence de la Ferrière (born 1957), Moroccan-born climber and explorer, first French woman to reach the South Pole alone in 1997
Catherine Ritz (graduated 1975), geographer, climatologist

Germany
Doris Abele (graduated 1984), marine biologist
Nancy Bertler (graduated 1996), geologist, ice core researcher
Anja Blacha (born 1990) expeditioner, longest solo, unsupported, unassisted polar expedition by a woman
Angelika Brandt (born 1961), deep-sea biologist
Katrin Linse (PhD 2000), marine benthic biologist
Karin Lochte (born 1952), oceanographer, climate change specialist
Cornelia Lüdecke (born 1954), meteorologist, writer
Bettina Meyer (PhD 1996), marine biologist
Monika Puskeppeleit (born 1955), physician, station leader of the first all-woman team to overwinter in Antarctica

India
Reena Kaushal Dharmshaktu, first Indian woman to ski to the South Pole 
Aditi Pant, oceanographer, first Indian woman to visit Antarctica in 1983
Sudipta Sengupta, structural geologist, mountaineer, visited in 1983
Meenakshi Wadhwa, cosmochemist, geologist, visited in 1992 and 2012 under ANSMET programs

Italy
Cinzia Verde (graduated 1987), biologist, writer

Japan
Junko Tabei (born 1939), mountaineer, the first woman to climb to the top of Mount Vinson, Antarctica's highest mountain

Malaysia
Siti Aisyah Alias (born 1966), marine biologist

Morocco
Merieme Chadid (born 1969), astronomer

Netherlands
Corina Brussaard (PhD 1997), viral ecologist
Anita Buma (graduated 1984), marine ecophysiologist
Monique de Vries (born 1947), politician, polar research supporter

New Zealand
Rosemary Askin geologist, palynologist
Nancy Bertler climate scientist and ice core specialist
Margaret Bradshaw British-born New Zealand geologist
Ann Chapman (1937–2009) limnologist, first woman to lead an Antarctic expedition
Marie Darby marine biologist and teacher, first New Zealand woman to visit the Antarctic mainland
Edith Farkas (1921–1993) Hungarian-born meteorologist, ozone researcher
Roberta Farrell American-born biologist, educator
Christina Hulbe glaciologist
Pat Langhorne sea ice physicist
Victoria Metcalf marine biologist, educator
Christina Riesselman paleoceanographer
Natalie Robinson polar oceanographer
Gillian Wratt botanist, first woman director of the New Zealand Antarctic Programme
Pamela Young first New Zealand woman to live and work in Antarctica

Norway
Liv Arnesen (born 1953) educator, cross-country skier, first woman to ski alone to the South Pole in 1994
Ingrid Christensen (1891–1976), early polar explorer, first woman to land on the Antarctic mainland or at least view land in Antarctica (1931)
Lillemor Rachlew (1902–1983), one of the first women to set foot on the Antarctic mainland in 1937
Cecilie Skog (born 1974), nurse, explorer, adventurer
Monica Kristensen Solås (born 1950), glaciologist, meteorologist, explorer

Pakistan
Namira Salim (born 1975), explorer, artist

Poland
Maria Olech (born 1941), biologist, lichenologist

Romania
Florica Topârceanu (born 1954), biologist, medical researcher

Russia/Soviet Union
Maria Klenova (1898–1976), marine geologist, first women to undertake scientific work in Antarctica in 1956, contributing to the first Soviet Antarctic atlas

South Africa
Bettine van Vuuren (graduated 1992), zoologist

South Korea
In-Young Ahn (graduated 1982), benthic ecologist, oceanographer
Ji Hee Kim (graduated 1991), biologist, environmentalist, writer
Hong Kum Lee (graduated 1989), marine biotechnologist

Spain
Susana Agustí (graduated 1982), biological oceanographer
Josefina Castellví (born 1935), oceanographer, biologist, writer
Carlota Escutia Dotti (graduated 1982), geologist

Sweden
Elisabeth Isaksson (graduated 1986), glaciologist, geologist
Anna Wåhlin (born 1970), physical oceanographer
Tina Sjögren (born 1959), Czech-born mountaineer, explorer, first woman to complete the Three Poles Challenge in 2002
Annelie Pompe (born 1981), adventurer, has climbed all seven summits, including Mount Vinson.
Johanna Davidsson (born 1983), adventurer, has skied alone from the coast to the South Pole.
Qin Sun physicist, 1994 participant of the AMANDA project in South Pole (Stockholm University)

Trinidad and Tobago
Marilyn Raphael (PhD 1990), climatologist, educator, writer

Turkey
Burcu Özsoy (born 1976), scientist
Şahika Ercümen (born 1985), freediver

Ukraine
Halyna Kolotnytska (born 1972), cook of The Second Ukrainian Antarctic Expedition 1997/98

United Kingdom
Louise Allcock (graduated 1992), marine biologist, editor
Felicity Aston (born 1977), explorer, climate scientist
Kim Crosbie (born c.1969), environmentalist, citizen scientist, writer
Ginny Fiennes (1947–2004), explorer, her Transglobe Expedition team was the first to reach the two poles
Jane Francis (born 1956), palaeoclimatologist, director of the British Antarctic Survey
Helen Fricker (graduated 1991), glaciologist, writer
Karen Heywood (graduated 1983), oceanographer, educator
Eleanor Honnywill (c.1919–2003), contributor to the British Antarctic Survey, writer
Joanne Johnson (born 1977), geologist, writer
Jennifer Lee, specialist in invasion biology
Hannah McKeand (born 1973) beat the record for solo skiing from the coast to the pole
Tavi Murray (PhD 1990), glaciologist
Elizabeth Morris (born 1946), glaciologist
Pom Oliver (born 1952), explorer, film producer
Sharon Robinson (born 1961), plant physiologist, climate change biologist
Jane Rumble, head of the Polar Regions Department, Foreign and Commonwealth Office, since 2007
Rosie Stancer (born 1960), explorer, adventurer
Janet Thomson (born 1942), geologist, first British woman to undertake field research in Antarctica
Fiona Thornewill (born 1966), explorer
Jemma Wadham (PhD 1998), glacial biogeochemist

United States
Ann Bancroft (born 1955), writer, educator, adventurer, first woman to complete Arctic and Antarctic expeditions
Jenny Baeseman (graduated 1998), civil engineer, environmentalist, geoscientist
Robin Bell (graduated 1980), polar ice specialist
Mary Odile Cahoon (1929–2011), Benedictine nun, early Antarctic biological researcher
Kelly Falkner (born 1960), chemical oceanographer, educator
Patricia Hepinstall, flight attendant, one of the first two women to fly to Antarctica in October 1957
Barbara Hillary (1931–2019), first African-American woman to reach both poles
Louise Huffman (born 1951), educator specializing in polar science
Christina Hulbe (MSc 1994), geologist, educator 
Lois Jones (1935–2000), geochemist, led the first all-woman science team to Antarctica in 1969
Kelly Jemison, geologist specializing in Antarctic diatoms 
Ruth Kelley, flight attendant, one of the first two women to fly to Antarctica in October 1957
Amy Leventer (graduated 1982), marine biologist, micropaleontologist
Diane McKnight (born 1953), environmental engineer, educator, editor
Mary Alice McWhinnie (1922–1980), biologist, first American woman to head an Antarctic research station
Jill Mikucki (graduated 1996), microbiologist
Robyn Millan (graduated 1995), astronomist, physicist, investigating radiation belts
Tori Murden (born 1963), explorer, first woman to reach the South Pole by land in 1989
Alison Murray (graduated 1989), microbiologist
Jerri Nielsen (1952–2009), physician, writer
Julie Palais (graduated 1974), glaciologist
Irene C. Peden (born 1925), electrical engineer, first American scientist to work in the Antarctic interior in 1970
Ann Peoples (graduated 1979), first American woman to have a management position in Antarctica
Erin Pettit (born 1971), glaciologist
Vanessa O'Brien (born 1964), mountain climber, explorer
Christina Riesselman (graduated 2001), paleoceanographer
Michelle Rogan-Finnemore (graduated 1981), scientist, legal expert
Jackie Ronne (1919–2009), explorer, first woman to be a working member of an Antarctic expedition (1947–48)
Christine Siddoway (born 1961), structural geologist
Deborah Steinberg (graduated 1987), oceanographer, zooplankton ecologist
Cristina Takacs-Vesbach (born 1968), microbial ecologist
Lynne Talley (born 1954), physical oceanographer
Trista Vick-Majors (graduated early 2000s), microbial ecologist
Diana Wall (PhD in 1971), environmental scientist and a soil ecologist
Sophie Warny (born 1969), Belgian-born palynologist
Terry Wilson (born 1954), geologist, tectonics specialist
Robin Aiello (marine biologist & scuba diver) scuba expedition McMurdo 1987

See also
Women in Antarctica
Timeline of women in Antarctica
List of female explorers and travelers

.
Lists of women scientists
Lists of explorers
Women